Sathya is a 2010 Indian Kannada romance drama film written and directed and produced by Kumar Govind under the banner S K Films. It stars Kumar Govind, Dimple, Padmavasanthi, Srishailan, Ravishankar.

Cast
 Kumar Govind as Sathya
 Dimple
 Padma Vasanthi
 Srishailan
 Ravishankar

Soundtrack

Awards

References

2010 films
2010s Kannada-language films
2010 romantic drama films
Indian romantic drama films
Films scored by Gautham